During the 1932–33 season Foot-Ball Club Juventus competed in Serie A and the Mitropa Cup.

Summary 
The team conquered in 1932–33 Serie A the third title in a row, its fifth ever with the fewest number of draws (only four) in their history until the 1994–95 campaign. In the Mitropa Cup the club reached the semi-finals, defeated by Austria Vienna in the first series ever against an Austrian team. In the summer, couch Carlo Carcano started looking to the market to reinforce the squad.

New players make a difference in this season with Defender Duilio Santagostino, midfielder, Mario Genta. Forward Francesco Imberti, was released but a young striker with only 18 years old Felice Placido Borel will become a legend in the club. 

Also, in this season the club left Campo di Corso Marsiglia and inaugurated a new field Stadio Benito Mussolini with a bigger capacity.

Squad 

(Captain)

Competitions

Serie A

League table

Matches

Statistics

Goalscorers
 

30 goals
 Felice Borel

15 goals
  Raimundo Orsi

12 goals
 Giovanni Ferrari

8 goals
  Renato Cesarini
  Pietro Sernagiotto

6 goals
  Luis Monti
 Giovanni Varglien

3 goals
 Federico Munerati
 Mario Varglien

2 goals
 Giovanni Vecchina

1 goal
 Virginio Rosetta

References

Juventus F.C. seasons
Juventus
Italian football championship-winning seasons